Javier Ángel Figueroa Larraín (January 17, 1862 – June 26, 1945) was a Chilean lawyer, politician and older brother of former President Emiliano Figueroa Larraín.

He was sworn as a lawyer in 1882 and then married Agnes Cañas Arrieta, who bore him five children.

He ran in the presidential election of 1915, but was narrowly defeated by Juan Luis Sanfuentes. He became a member of the Chilean Supreme Court in 1920, but was removed by Carlos Ibáñez del Campo during a power struggle between Ibáñez and Figueroa's brother, the president.

1862 births
1945 deaths
People from Santiago
Chilean people of Galician descent
Larraín family
Chilean people of Basque descent
Liberal Party (Chile, 1849) politicians
Chilean Ministers of the Interior
Deputies of the XXVII Legislative Period of the National Congress of Chile
Senators of the XXVIII Legislative Period of the National Congress of Chile
Candidates for President of Chile
Supreme Court of Chile members
University of Chile alumni